The UK Rapid Test Consortium (UK-RTC) is a United Kingdom industry consortium created to produce a lateral flow rapid test for COVID-19. Rapid tests are a form of COVID-19 testing technology that was originally developed from significant investment by the United Kingdom government to develop new forms of COVID-19 testing that provided advantages over existing forms such as PCR. Its members include Abingdon Health, BBI Solutions, CIGA Healthcare, Omega Diagnostics, and Oxford University.

In 2020, the consortium developed the AbC-19 rapid antibody test to meet UK government requirements. The government ordered 1 million of the UK-RTC's rapid tests in October 2020.

CIGA Healthcare was made responsible for assembly and distribution, and was awarded distribution to the United States in November 2020 after approval was given by the FDA.

References

2020 establishments in the United Kingdom
COVID-19 pandemic in the United Kingdom
COVID-19 testing
Consortia in the United Kingdom
United Kingdom responses to the COVID-19 pandemic